Cannibal Corpse is a five-piece American death metal band formed in 1988 in Buffalo, New York. In 1989, their self-titled demo drew the attention of Metal Blade Records, with whom they signed a contract to record their debut album Eaten Back to Life, which was released in 1990, followed by two studio albums, 1991's Butchered at Birth, and 1992's Tomb of the Mutilated. In 1993, lead guitarist Bob Rusay was fired, and was replaced by Rob Barrett, who joined the group in time to appear with the band in Jim Carrey's film Ace Ventura: Pet Detective.

In 1994, they released The Bleeding, the debut record with Barrett, and the last album with vocalist Chris Barnes, who left the band to concentrate on his side project Six Feet Under. Then, Monstrosity vocalist George "Corpsegrinder" Fisher took over as vocalist, with whom the band released Vile in 1996, resulting as the band's first album to appear on the Billboard 200 chart, debuting at number 151. On the next album, 1998's Gallery of Suicide, Rob Barrett was replaced by Pat O'Brien. In 1999, they released Bloodthirst, followed by the group's first live album, Live Cannibalism (2000). Gore Obsessed was released in 2002, followed by the boxed set 15 Year Killing Spree, a four-disc career retrospective, that was released in 2003. The ninth album The Wretched Spawn, was released in 2004, followed by Kill in 2006, which appeared on the Billboard 200 chart at number 170.

In between The Wretched Spawn and Kill, founding guitarist Jack Owen left the band, being replaced by former Cannibal Corpse and Malevolent Creation guitarist Rob Barrett, who had played with the band from 1993 until 1997. As of 2008, their latest release is the DVD Centuries of Torment: The First 20 Years, containing a three-disc documentary with the band's history and several concert performances. In 2009, Evisceration Plague became their first release to crack the Top 100 of the Billboard 200 at number 66. Torture was released in 2012. It sold 9,600 copies in its first week, enough to enter the top 40 on the American albums chart, peaking at 38. A Skeletal Domain was released in 2014. It sold 8,800 copies in its first week and hit 32 on the Billboard 200. Red Before Black was released in 2017.

Cannibal Corpse received its best sales week yet and first top 10 on Billboard Top Album Sales as Violence Unimagined entered at No. 6 with 14,000 sold in April 2021.

Albums

Studio albums

Live albums

Box sets

Extended plays

Videos

Video albums

Music videos

References

External links
 
[ Cannibal Corpse] at Allmusic

Heavy metal group discographies
Cannibal Corpse
Discographies of American artists